Jacco Eltingh and Paul Haarhuis defeated the defending champions Donald Johnson and Jared Palmer in the final, 7–6(7–2), 6–4, to win the gentlemen's invitation doubles tennis title at the 2009 Wimbledon Championships.

Draw

Final

Group A
Standings are determined by: 1. number of wins; 2. number of matches; 3. in two-players-ties, head-to-head records; 4. in three-players-ties, percentage of sets won, or of games won; 5. steering-committee decision.

Group B
Standings are determined by: 1. number of wins; 2. number of matches; 3. in two-players-ties, head-to-head records; 4. in three-players-ties, percentage of sets won, or of games won; 5. steering-committee decision.

External links
 Draw

Men's Invitation Doubles